Helen Grant may refer to:

Helen Grant (field hockey) (born 1979), England women's field hockey player
Helen Grant (politician) (born 1961), British Member of Parliament
Helen Grant (author) (born 1964), British author of novels for young adults
Helen Grant (Holby City), character from the UK television series Holby City, played by Susannah York

See also
Maria Grant (Helen Maria Grant; 1843–1907), Canadian women's rights activist and politician
The Helen Grant Books, series of novels by US author Amanda Minnie Douglas (1831–1916)